Zhenjiang, alternately romanized as Chinkiang, is a prefecture-level city in Jiangsu Province, China. It lies on the southern bank of the Yangtze River near its intersection with the Grand Canal. It is opposite Yangzhou (to its north) and between Nanjing (to its west) and Changzhou (to its east). Zhenjiang was formerly the provincial capital of Jiangsu and remains as an important transportation hub.
As of the 2020 census, its total population was 3,210,418 inhabitants whom 1,266,790 lived in the built-up (or metro) area made of the 3 urban districts.
The town is best known both in China and abroad for its fragrant black vinegar, a staple of Chinese cooking.

Names

Former names include Jingkou and Runzhou.

History

A part of Zhenjiang was held by Ce, Marquess of Yi, under the early Zhou dynasty. It was subsequently known as Zhufang and Guyang. After the unification of China by Shi Huangdi of Qin in 221BC, the area was organized as the county (xian) of Dantu. One Chinese legend relates that the site's fengshui was so advantageous that the First Emperor ordered 3000 prisoners to dig a tunnel through one of its hills to dissipate its qi. In the middle of the 3rd centuryBC, Dantu was elevated to the status of a commandery (jun).

The Sui took the city in AD581 and made it an important garrison on the lower Yangtze, the source of its present name ("Protecting the River"). In 595, it was restored to commandery status. Its importance grew with the construction of the Grand Canal, after which it served as the chief collection and transit center for the grain tax paid by the farmers of the Yangtze delta. The city flourished from the 10th to 13th centuries, when it produced fine silks, satins, and silverware for the Song emperors. The 11th-century scientist and statesman Shen Kuo composed his 1088 Dream Pool Essays during his retirement in a garden estate on the outskirts of the city. It was taken by the Mongolians during their 1275 campaign against the Southern Song capital at Hangzhou. Under their Yuan dynasty, some Nestorian Christians were reported living in the city. The city fell to Xu Da on 17 March 1356. According to Odoric of Pordenone, Zhenjiang had a vast amount of shipping, more so than any other city in the world. The ships which worked the city were painted white and often doubled as businesses such as taverns or other gathering spots. Under the Ming, it was the seat of a prefecture (fu) of Nanzhili, the Southern Directly-Administered District around the secondary capital Nanjing. The Southern Ming placed the town under Zheng Zhifeng, brother of Zheng Zhilong and favorite uncle of Koxinga. He was fooled into wasting most of his ammunition against a feint, however, and forced to abandon the city to the Manchus on 1 June 1645.

It continued as a prefectural seat, first under the "Right" Governor of Jiangnan at Suzhou and later under the governor of Jiangsu in Jiangning (now Nanjing). After a fierce resistance, Zhenjiangromanized at the time as Chinkiangwas captured by the British on 21 July 1842 during the First Opium War. As this left the path open to Nanjing, its fall prompted the unequal Treaty of Nanking to avoid further conflict. A decade later, massive floods of the Yellow River altered its course from south to north of Shandong and closed the northern path of the Grand Canal. Soon after, Zhenjiang was sacked by the Taiping rebels in 1853. It was recaptured by the Qing in 1858 and opened as a treaty port in 1861. Into the 1870s, Chaozhou merchants used their connections in Zhenjiang to make it a regional distribution center for opium purchased from the foreign merchants in Shanghai; when David Sassoon attempted to avoid taxation by delivering his cargoes directly to the opium merchants in Zhenjiang, the Chinese organized to intimidate his customers and then bought out his failed organization. The population was estimated at 168,000 in 1904.

The southern part of the Grand Canal was obstructed in the early 20th century, although by that point the city was connected by rail to Shanghai and Nanjing. The Kuomintang government revoked the British concession at Zhenjiang in 1929.

From 1928 to 1949, while Nanjing served as the capital of the Republic of China, Zhenjiang served as the provincial capital for Jiangsu. During World War II, the city fell to Japan's Shanghai Expeditionary Army in the morning of 8 December 1937, shortly before the capture of Nanjing, but local resistance to the Japanese is still celebrated among the Chinese. When the Communists won the Chinese Civil War and relocated the capital to Beijing, Nanjing resumed its role as Jiangsu's capital.

Zhenjiang is still one of China's busiest ports for domestic commerce, serving as a hub for trade among Jiangsu, Anhui, and Shanghai. The trade mostly consists of grain, cotton, oils, and lumber. The other main industries are mostly in the field of food processing and paper pulp manufacturing.

Geography

Climate

Administration

The prefecture-level city of Zhenjiang administers 6 county-level divisions, including three districts and three county-level cities.

These are further divided into 77 township-level divisions, including 66 towns, 1 township and 10 subdistricts.

Demographics
As in Nanjing, Zhenjiang's old Wu dialects have been entirely supplanted by a dialect of Lower Yangtze Mandarin. It is incomprehensible to the residents of neighboring Changzhou, whose dialect remains a form of Taihu Wu.

Culture

Zhenjiang is most famous for its fragrant black vinegar, called Zhenjiang vinegar. Chinese legend traces it to Heita, the son of Dukang, the supposed inventor of alcoholic beverages. Having forgotten about a vat of wine for 21 days, he found it had spoiled but now possessed a pleasant sour taste that could be used to complement foods. The present recipe is said to date back 1400 years, with its major modern manufacturer—the Jiangsu Hengshun Vinegar Industry Co.—dating to 1840.

Other local specialties include crab cream bun, Chinkiang pork (akin to head cheese), and pickled vegetables. Formerly, households in Zhenjiang would prepare for the new year by eating a red-bean dish and avoiding rice. One bowl of beans was left on the table to feed the home's flies, from the belief that they would then avoid disturbing the family during the new year festivities.

A natural spring in a park on the edge of Zhenjiang has been famed since the Tang (7th–9th century) as the best in Jiangsu for making tea. It is now marketed as the "First Spring under Heaven".

The hilly scenery in Zhenjiang's southern suburbs was considered beautiful enough to be the theme of many landscapes by Chinese painters. The 15th-century Japanese ink-wash master Sesshū Tōyō studied in Zhenjiang.

The local Jinshan temple appears in the tale of Madame White Snake and inspired a replica in the Kangxi Emperor's garden at Chengde.

Transport

Zhenjiang is located in the convenient Yangtze River Delta transport corridor, at the crossroads of the Grand Canal and the Yangtze, and between the Shanghai and Nanjing economic regions. The Port of Zhenjiang is the third largest port on the Yangtze.  The city has two Yangtze River crossings.  The Runyang Yangtze River Bridge complex, which has one of the longest suspension bridge spans in the world, connects to Yangzhou.  The Taizhou Yangtze River Bridge, one of the longest cable-stayed bridges in the world, connects Yongzhong with Taizhou.

Rail
Zhenjiang has been connected by rail since 1906, at the completion of the Nanjing-Shanghai Railway. The railway was extended to Beijing after the completion of the Nanjing Yangtze River Bridge in 1968, connecting Zhenjiang to China's political and commercial hubs. The primary railway station was Zhenjiang West Railway Station, which was demolished in 2004 due to congestion it caused in the city center. Since then Zhenjiang Railway Station has served as the city's principal railway station.

High-speed rail 

In 2011, the Beijing–Shanghai High-Speed Railway was completed. Trains on the line stop at Zhenjiang South Railway Station. The two high-speed lines have reduced travel time between Zhenjiang and Shanghai to under an hour, and travel time to Beijing to under five hours. Rail service to Shanghai is frequent - averaging one train in less than half an hour.

Air
Zhenjiang does not have a commercial airport within its city limits, although there is a military airfield, Zhenjiang Dalu Airport, which may open to regional flights in the future. Check-in facilities are available for Lukou Airport in the New Zhenjiang Bus Station.

Roadways
Zhenjiang is on the route of Beijing-Shanghai Expressway, and China National Highway 312.

Public transport
, Zhenjiang had an extensive number of bus routes - numbering nearly one hundred. Since 2012 the city's entire fleet of city buses are equipped with GPS and are managed centrally through a "smart transport network system."

Industry
Zhenjiang Export Processing Zone is located close to Changzhou Airport and Zhenjiang Port.

Education
Public institutions having full-time Bachelor's degree programs include Jiangsu University and the Jiangsu University of Science and Technology. Zhenjiang is home to the Silkworm Raising Research Institute of the Academy of Agricultural Science of China. The Shaozong Library includes a 100-volume collection of sayings and proverbs dating from the 7th to 11th centuries.

Senior high schools are Jiangsu Provincial Zhenjiang No. 1 High School, the Zhenjiang High School of Jiangsu Province and the Jiangsu Provincial Dagang High School.

Notable people
 Liu E (1857–1909), late Qing dynasty writer
 Pearl S. Buck also known as Sai Zhenzhu, (1892–1973), Nobel Prize-winning author of The Good Earth and other novels about China, lived in Zhenjiang with her missionary parents until the age of 18. Her parents' home is preserved on the grounds of a semiconductor factory in Zhenjiang; nearby is Zhengiiang Number 2 Middle School at which she studied and taught.
 Li Lanqing (born 1932), former vice premier of China.
 Shen Kuo (1031–1095), Song dynasty Scientist.
 Hudson Taylor (1832–1905), British Missionary, Buried in Zhenjiang
 Li Pei (1917–2017), linguist and English professor
 Wei Wei (born 1922), film actress
 Si Guo  (1918-2004), English name Frederick Tsai, renowned essayist & translator who worked in Hong Kong for most of his career
 Liu Xin (born 1975), prominent CGTN host
 Liu Chuanzhi, founder of Lenovo

Twin towns – sister cities
 Kiskőrös, Hungary
 Kuching, Malaysia
 Stavropol, Russia
 Tsu, Mie, Japan
 Tempe, Arizona, United States

See also
List of twin towns and sister cities in China

Notes

References
 
 .
 .

External links

 
 Government website of Zhenjiang (available in Chinese and English)
 Tempe Sister Cities

 
Cities in Jiangsu
Populated places on the Yangtze River